Krnsko is a municipality and village in Mladá Boleslav District in the Central Bohemian Region of the Czech Republic. It has about 600 inhabitants.

Administrative parts
The village of Řehnice is an administrative part of Krnov.

Geography
It lies in the Jizera Table. The municipality is situated on the right bank of the Jizera River.

History
The first written mention of Krnsko is from 1360 and of Řehnice from 1319.

Sights
The railway bridge in Krnsko, Stránovský viaduct, was built in 1924 and has been protected as a technical monument.

Gallery

References

External links

Villages in Mladá Boleslav District